The Monument to the Victory of Chacabuco, also known as the Monument to the Battle of Chacabuco (truly To the Victory of Chacabuco), is a monument that commemorates the Battle of Chacabuco, which took place on February 12, 1817.  It was designed by Héctor Román Latorre and built in 1971. It is 20 meters tall.

It is located in the General San Martín highway, close to Los Andes, in Colina commune.

It has an inscription in Spanish that says:

In English, this reads:

References

Chilean War of Independence
Monuments and memorials in Santiago
1971 sculptures